Frédéric Chopin wrote a number of preludes for piano solo. His cycle of 24 Preludes, Op. 28, covers all major and minor keys. In addition, Chopin wrote three other preludes: a prelude in C minor, Op. 45; a piece in A major from 1834; and an unfinished piece in E minor. These are sometimes referred to as Nos. 25, 26, and 27, respectively.

24 Preludes, Op. 28
  

Chopin's 24 Preludes, Op. 28, are a set of short pieces for the piano, one in each of the twenty-four keys, originally published in 1839.

Chopin wrote them between 1835 and 1839, partly at Valldemossa, Mallorca, where he spent the winter of 1838–39 and where he had fled with George Sand and her children to escape the damp Paris weather. In Majorca, Chopin had a copy of Bach's The Well-Tempered Clavier, and as in each of Bach's two sets of preludes and fugues, his Op. 28 set comprises a complete cycle of the major and minor keys, albeit with a different ordering.

The manuscript, which Chopin carefully prepared for publication, carries a dedication to the German pianist and composer Joseph Christoph Kessler. The French and English editions (Catelin, Wessel) were dedicated to the piano-maker and publisher Camille Pleyel, who had commissioned the work for 2,000 francs (equivalent to nearly $30,000 in present day). The German edition (Breitkopf & Härtel) was dedicated to Kessler, who ten years earlier had dedicated his own set of 24 Preludes, Op. 31, to Chopin.

Whereas the term "prelude" had hitherto been used to describe an introductory piece, Chopin's pieces stand as self-contained units, each conveying a specific idea or emotion. He thus imparted new meaning to a genre title that at the time was often associated with improvisatory "preluding". In publishing the 24 preludes together as a single opus, comprising miniatures that could either be used to introduce other music or as self-standing works, Chopin challenged contemporary attitudes regarding the worth of small musical forms.

Whereas Bach had arranged his collection of 48 preludes and fugues according to keys separated by rising semitones, Chopin's chosen key sequence is a circle of fifths, with each major key being followed by its relative minor, and so on (i.e. C major, A minor, G major, E minor, etc.). Since this sequence of related keys is much closer to common harmonic practice, it is thought that Chopin might have conceived the cycle as a single performance entity for continuous recital. An opposing view is that the set was never intended for continuous performance, and that the individual preludes were indeed conceived as possible introductions for other works.

Chopin himself never played more than four of the preludes at any single public performance. Nor was this the practice for the 25 years after his death. The first pianist to program the complete set in a recital was probably Anna Yesipova for a concert in 1876. Nowadays, the complete set of Op. 28 preludes has become repertory fare, and many concert pianists have recorded the entire set, beginning with Ferruccio Busoni in 1915, when making piano rolls for the Duo-Art label. Alfred Cortot was the next pianist to record the complete preludes in 1926. 

As with his other works, Chopin did not himself attach names or descriptions to any of the Op. 28 preludes, in contrast to many of Robert Schumann's and Franz Liszt's pieces.

Reputation and legacy
The brevity and apparent lack of formal structure in the Op. 28 set caused some consternation among critics at the time of their publication. No prelude is longer than 90 bars (No. 17), and the shortest (No. 7) is ca. 45 sec. and No. 9 is a mere 12 bars (but 1m25s). Schumann said: "[t]hey are sketches, beginnings of études, or, so to speak, ruins, individual eagle pinions, all disorder and wild confusions." Liszt's opinion, however, was more positive: "Chopin's Preludes are compositions of an order entirely apart... they are poetic preludes, analogous to those of a great contemporary poet, who cradles the soul in golden dreams..."

Among more recent assessments, musicologist Henry Finck said that "if all piano music in the world were to be destroyed, excepting one collection, my vote should be cast for Chopin's Preludes." Biographer Jeremy Nicholas writes that "[e]ven on their own, the 24 Preludes would have ensured Chopin's claim to immortality."

Despite the lack of formal thematic structure, motives do appear in more than one prelude. Scholar Jeffrey Kresky has argued that Chopin's Op. 28 is more than the sum of its parts:

Descriptions

The first four measures of Frédéric Chopin's Prelude No. 21 are shown below.

Comparisons

Chopin's Op. 28 preludes have been compared to Johann Sebastian Bach's preludes in The Well-Tempered Clavier. However, each of Bach's preludes leads to a fugue in the same key, and Bach's pieces are arranged, in each of the work's two volumes, in ascending chromatic order (with major preceding parallel minor), while Chopin's are arranged in a circle of fifths (with major preceding relative minor). Chopin is known to have studied Bach's music, although he is not known to have performed it publicly.

Harold C. Schonberg, in The Great Pianists, writes: "It also is hard to escape the notion that Chopin was very familiar with Hummel's now-forgotten Op. 67, composed in 1815 – a set of twenty-four preludes in all major and minor keys, starting with C major." As Schonberg says: "the openings of the Hummel A minor and Chopin E minor concertos are too close to be coincidental." The dedicatee of Chopin's set, Joseph Christoph Kessler, also used the circle of fifths in his 24 Études, Op. 20, which were dedicated to Hummel.

Chopin's other preludes

Chopin wrote three other preludes.

Prelude No. 25 (Op. 45)
The Prelude in C minor, Op. 45 (sometimes listed as Prelude No. 25), was composed in 1841. It was dedicated to Princess E. Czernicheff (Elisaweta Tschernyschewa), and contains widely extending basses and highly expressive and effective chromatic modulations over a rather uniform thematic basis.

Prelude No. 26

The untitled Presto con leggierezza in A major was composed in 1834 as a gift for Pierre Wolff and published in Geneva in 1918. Sometimes known as Prelude No. 26, the piece is very short and generally bright in tone.

"Devil's Trill" Prelude (No. 27)
A further prelude exists in E minor and has been subtitled "Devil's Trill" by Jeffrey Kallberg, a professor of music history at the University of Pennsylvania. Kallberg gave it this nickname for its similarities to Giuseppe Tartini's violin sonata known as The Devil's Trill, Tartini being a likely influence on Chopin. The original signature was hastily scrawled (more so than usual of Chopin's original manuscripts).

Chopin left this piece uncompleted and seems to have discarded it; while he worked on it during his stay on Majorca, the E minor prelude that ultimately formed part of the Op. 28 set is an unrelated piece. Kallberg's realisation of the prelude from Chopin's almost illegible sketches goes no further than where Chopin left off. The piece had its first public performance in July 2002 at the Newport Music Festival in Newport, Rhode Island, with the pianist Alain Jacquon.

Notes and references
Notes

References

Sources

Further reading
 Leontsky, Jan: Interpreting Chopin. 24 Preludes, Op. 28. Analysis, comments and interpretive choices. Tarnhelm editions.

External links

 
 Préludes Op. 28: Free scores at Musopen
 BBC Discovering Music: Audio Program covering Chopin's Opus 28 Preludes
 , Jeffrey Kallberg

Compositions by Frédéric Chopin
Compositions for solo piano
1834 compositions
1839 compositions
1841 compositions
Chopin
Chopin
The Devil in classical music
Music with dedications